The Mystery of the Spiral Bridge is Volume 45 in the original The Hardy Boys Mystery Stories published by Grosset & Dunlap.

This book was written for the Stratemeyer Syndicate by Andrew E. Svenson in 1966.

Plot summary
The Hardy Boys track down the saboteurs who kidnapped their father, and have to keep them from blowing up a bridge near Boontown, Kentucky. The bridge is being built by Tony Prito's father's construction company. Mr Hardy is ill most of the story. The villains are mostly ex-crooks who want that area of the bridge for themselves.

References

1966 American novels
1966 children's books
Grosset & Dunlap books
Novels set in Kentucky
The Hardy Boys books